Becoming Dick is a 2000 comedy movie-made-for-television starring Harland Williams and directed by Bob Saget.

Plot

Richard Breggs (Harland Williams) is a struggling actor living in an apartment with his girlfriend. After a conversation with a friend, Richard decides that he is too much of a "nice guy" and that the key to success is to act like a jerk. After his new obnoxious personality lands him a part in a play, Richard thinks he is on his way to being a success. He goes to sleep in his apartment and wakes up in a mansion. It is four years later, but Richard doesn't remember anything that has happened in the elapsed time, due to an accidental bump on the head that gave him amnesia. It turns out that he is now a famous TV star, known for being obnoxious, selfish, and difficult to work with. Richard (now known as Dick) realizes that while his new personality gave him success, it also caused him to lose his girlfriend and best friend. He sets about trying to right the wrongs of the past 4 years.

Production
The film was shot in Vancouver, British Columbia, Canada.

References

External links

2000 films
2000 comedy films
2000 television films
E! original programming
Films about actors
Films about amnesia
Films directed by Bob Saget
Films shot in Vancouver
2000s English-language films